The Stolen Chimney is a traditional rock climbing route located on the Ancient Arts tower of one of the Fisher Towers.  This is the most common route to ascend the cork screw summit of the tower.  The cork screw summit is the westernmost summit of the Ancient Arts tower but it is not the tallest.  The summit is noteworthy for its extremely unusually shape which makes climbing the technically different from most other climbs.  The unusual shape also makes it visually striking.  Photographs of the cork screw summit have been extensively published in many settings including mainstream advertisements.

The name of this route, Stolen Chimney, is often confused with the name of the tower it is on, Ancient Arts, and the name of the summit, the cork screw summit. This is likely because this is by far the most popular climb on Ancient Arts and is predominantly known for the cork screw summit.

References 

Climbing routes